Gilles Tordjman (born 31 August 1962 in Paris) is a French musicologist, journalist and literary critic.

Biography 
After graduating with a master's degree in philosophy in 1984, he wrote for Le Matin de Paris and L'Express before joining Les Inrockuptibles in 1992 where he was an editorial writer for five years.

In April 1997, Gilles Tordjman left Les Inrockuptibles following a polemic in the editorial office about Michel Bounan's book, L'Art de Céline et son temps which he had defended. He then joined .

He is also a literary critic, particularly interested in Emmanuel Bove, Marius Jacob, Guy Debord and also Fernando Pessoa, Sun Tzu and Baltasar Gracián to whom Gilles Tordjman devoted long articles or postfaces when their works were reissued.

In 2012, he published an article against Bob Dylan in the special issue of Télérama devoted to the American singer.

 Quote 

 Bibliography 
2006: Leonard Cohen,   
1998: C'est déjà tout de suite, preface by Éric Holder, Céra-nrs éditions  (collection of chronics published in les Inrockuptibles.)
1994: Duke Ellington, in collaboration with François Billard, Éditions du Seuil, 

 Prefaces, postfaces 
2006: Philippe Robert, Rock, pop, éd. Le Mot et le reste
1997: Baltasar Gracián, L'Homme de cour, . 
1996: Fernando Pessoa, Ultimatum, Mille et une nuits
1996: Sun Tzu, The Art of War, Mille et une nuits
1995: Jonathan Swift, A Modest Proposal, Mille et une nuits

 Translations 
2014: Tarquin Hall, Les Aventures d'un bébé journaliste, translated from English, Globe
2013: Steven Levy, L'Éthique des hackers, translated from English, Globe
2000: Norman Cohn, Cosmos, chaos et le monde qui vient, translated from English, 
1990: Stan Motjuwadi and David Bristow, Soweto, preface by Johnny Clegg, translated from English, 

 References 

 See also 
 Leonard Cohen
 Les Inrockuptibles External links 
 Présentation du livre sur Leonard Cohen on the site of the publisher
 Debord et l'honneur de l'imprécation, article published in Libération in December 1994
 Article on Eric Dolphy published in Les Inrockuptibles in 1996
 L'autisme critique, article published in Vibrations in 2004
 Le MP3 mutile le son et l'audition, article published in Le Monde 2 29 August 2008
 Open letter to Laurent Joffrin in February 2009 on mediapart.fr
 Jacques-Alain Léger : pas d'autre vie que la sienne, article published in August on 2013 larepubliquedeslivres.com
 Gilles Tordjman as a jewish crooner
 Leonard Cohen, un art de la guerre (intervention in the symposium L'âme juive de Leonard Cohen'', Institut européen Emmanuel Levinas, 2014)

20th-century French journalists
21st-century French journalists
Jazz writers
French music critics
20th-century French musicologists
21st-century French musicologists
French literary critics
English–French translators
Writers from Paris
1962 births
Living people